The 6th Ulster Trophy was a non-championship Formula One motor race held at the Dundrod Circuit on 7 June 1952. The race was won from pole position by Piero Taruffi in a Ferrari 375, setting fastest lap in the process. Mike Hawthorn in a Cooper T20-Bristol was second and Joe Kelly third in an Alta GP.

Results

1Neither Fangio nor Moss recorded a time but were allowed to start from the rear of the grid.

References

Ulster Trophy